The Koobabbie Important Bird Area comprises several disjunct, mostly linear, patches of land with a collective area of 254 ha. It lies in the northern wheatbelt region of Western Australia, about 20 km south-east of Coorow. It consists of remnant salmon gum woodlands on the Koobabbie farming property that provide the nesting habitat of large tree hollows necessary for breeding cockatoos.

Birds
The site has been identified by BirdLife International as an Important Bird Area (IBA) because it supports up to 32 nesting pairs, over 1% of the breeding population, of the endangered Carnaby's cockatoo. It also supports populations of western corellas, regent parrots and blue-breasted fairywrens.  Malleefowl and bustards have been observed in the IBA though they are not resident there.

References

Wheatbelt (Western Australia)
Important Bird Areas of Western Australia